The 2017 Balkans Cup was a rugby league football tournament that was held in Serbia between October 6 and October 10, 2017. 

Three teams competed in the 2017 event. These teams were: Serbia, Greece and Bulgaria.

After a series of round robin matches, Serbia were crowned champions for the first time in their history.

Teams

Stadiums

Fixtures

Round 1

Greece vs Bulgaria

Round 2

Serbia vs Greece

Round 3

Serbia vs Bulgaria

References 

Balkans Cup (rugby league)